SONACOME (Société Nationale de Construction Mecanique) is an Algerian construction equipment maker.

Established in Algiers in 1967, the company has produced an off road vehicle for the Dakar Rally.

SNVI, a truck manufacturer, is a subsidiary.

Products 

 M210 transport truck
 C260 transport truck
 b350 transport truck
 K66 dump truck
 K120 transport truck
 K66 transport truck
 49V8 Autocar
 100v8 Autobus
 Safir Autocar
 100 L6 Autobus

Truck manufacturers of Algeria
Vehicle manufacturing companies established in 1957
Algerian brands
1957 establishments in Algeria

ar:SNVI
fr:Entreprise nationale des véhicules industriels
it:Sonacome
lt:Sonacome
ru:Sonacome
Companies of Algeria